Hainanese Romanized, also known as its local name Bǽh-oe-tu (白話字), is an orthography similar to Pe̍h-oē-jī, and used to write Haikou dialect of the Hainanese language. It was invented by Carl C. Jeremiassen, a Danish pioneer missionary in Fucheng (modern Haikou) in 1881.

Spelling schemes

Consonants

Vowels

Tones

Sample texts from Hainanese Bibles

See also
Hainanese Transliteration Scheme

Hainan Min
Latin-script orthographies
Romanization of Chinese